Pekka Rauhala (born 25 April 1960) is a Finnish wrestler. He competed at the 1980, 1984, 1988 and the 1992 Summer Olympics.

References

External links
 

1960 births
Living people
Finnish male sport wrestlers
Olympic wrestlers of Finland
Wrestlers at the 1980 Summer Olympics
Wrestlers at the 1984 Summer Olympics
Wrestlers at the 1988 Summer Olympics
Wrestlers at the 1992 Summer Olympics
People from Muurame
Sportspeople from Central Finland
20th-century Finnish people